The 1972 Race of Champions was a non-championship Formula One race held at Brands Hatch on 19 March 1972. The race was also open to Formula 5000 cars. F1 driver Emerson Fittipaldi qualified on pole, set fastest lap and won. Alan Rollinson was the best-placed F5000 finisher, and tenth overall.

Qualifying

Classification

1McRae withdrew in protest after having had his win in the F5000 Championship race overturned.

References 

http://www.silhouet.com/motorsport/archive/f1/nc/1972/1972.html#roc

Race of Champions (Brands Hatch)
Race of Champions
Gold
Race of Champions